Brian McGuire may refer to:

Brian McGuire Cashman, baseball executive
Brian Patrick McGuire, historian 
Brian McGuire (racing driver), (1945 – 1977)